Wordsworth House is a Georgian townhouse situated in Cockermouth, Cumbria, England, and in the ownership of the National Trust. It was built in the mid-18th century. William Wordsworth was born in the house in 1770. The house is a Grade I listed building. It is open to the public as a writer's house museum from March to October each year.

History
The house was built in 1745 for Joshua Lucock who was then the High Sheriff of Cumberland. It was sold in 1761 to James Lowther, 1st Earl of Lonsdale, who allowed his agent John Wordsworth and Anne Cookson to live there rent free, where William Wordsworth and his brothers and sisters were born. Wordsworth would live there until he was around eight years old, when his mother died in 1778, and when his father died in 1783, the house was emptied. It would remain a private property until the 1930s, when it was sold to a local bus company who intended to demolish it and build a bus station.

After a national campaign, the building was purchased and donated to the National Trust in 1938. Wordsworth House was designated a Grade I listed building on 28 August 1951. In November 2009, Cumbria was hit by flooding. Wordsworth House was one of many historic houses in the region to be affected by the floods, but was relatively lucky in that volunteers were able to move many of the historical artefacts to the dry floors of the house.

Building
The building is located at Main Street, Cockermouth. It was built in 1745, made of stone, with stone quoins. The door has doric columns either side, There is a small garden to the front.

See also

Grade I listed buildings in Cumbria
Listed buildings in Cockermouth
Dove Cottage
Rydal Mount

References

External links

Biographical museums in Cumbria
Georgian architecture in England
Grade I listed houses in Cumbria
Historic house museums in Cumbria
Houses completed in the 18th century
Literary museums in England
National Trust properties in Cumbria
Poetry museums
William Wordsworth
Cockermouth